Washington Township is the name of several municipalities in the U.S. state of New Jersey:

Washington Township, Bergen County, New Jersey
Washington Township, Burlington County, New Jersey
Washington Township, Gloucester County, New Jersey
Washington Township, Morris County, New Jersey
Washington Township, Warren County, New Jersey

See also
Robbinsville Township, New Jersey, known as Washington Township until 2008
Washington, New Jersey, a borough in Warren County
Washington Township (disambiguation)

New Jersey township disambiguation pages